Nézignan-l'Évêque is a commune in the Hérault department in the Occitanie region in southern France.

Population

Sights
Arboretum du Figuier
Church of Saint Marie-Madeleine

See also
Communes of the Hérault department

References

Communes of Hérault